Disney's American Legends is a 2001 American animated anthology film narrated by James Earl Jones. It is a compilation of four previously released animated musical shorts from Walt Disney Animation Studios based on American tall tales. The film features The Brave Engineer (1950), Paul Bunyan (1958), John Henry (2000), and The Legend of Johnny Appleseed which is a segment from the 1948 film Melody Time.

The film's new short is based on John Henry and stars Alfre Woodard and Tim Hodge. John Henry was later released on Blu-ray in Walt Disney Animation Studios Short Films Collection on August 18, 2015.

Content

John Henry (2000)
Based on the story of John Henry, a mighty railroad worker who raced against a steam drill.
 production company: Walt Disney Feature Animation Florida
 Director: Mark Henn
 Producer: Steven Keller
 Writer: Broose Johnson, Tim Hodge, Shirley Pierce
 Music: Score by Stephen James Taylor, original songs by Gary Hines and Billy Steele and performed by Sounds of Blackness
 Art Director: Robert Stanton

The Legend of Johnny Appleseed (1948)
Based on the story of Johnny Appleseed (voiced by Dennis Day), a nurseryman who introduced apple trees to Ohio and Indiana. The short was originally featured in the 1948 film Melody Time.
 Director: Wilfred Jackson
 Producer: Walt Disney
 Writer: Winston Hibler, Erdman Penner, Joe Rinaldi, Jesse Marsh
 Music: Paul J. Smith
 Art Director: Mary Blair

Paul Bunyan (1958)
Based on the story of Paul Bunyan (voiced by Thurl Ravenscroft), a folklore giant lumberjack, and his blue-colored ox, Babe.
 Director: Les Clark
 Producer: Walt Disney
 Writer: Lance Nolley, Ted Berman
 Music: George Bruns
 Lyrics: Tom Adair
 Art Director: Eyvind Earle

The Brave Engineer (1950)
Based on the exploits of railroad engineer Casey Jones.
 Director: Jack Kinney
 Producer: Walt Disney
 Writer: Dick Kinney, Dick Shaw
 Music: Ken Darby

Reception
Mike Pinsky, of DVD Verdict, reviewed the compilation saying, "If, as James Earl Jones says in the finale, the message of this film is to "look for the heroes around you and celebrate them," Disney's American Legends is an interesting, if half-hearted, attempt to carry out that advice." Kirby C. Holt, Toon Talk, reviewed the compilation saying, "Although the program definitely presents the shorts in descending order of quality, it ends on a high note with these inspirational words from James Earl Jones: "Look for the heroes around you and celebrate them ... you can find them in the past, in the present, even in the mirror."

Notes

References

External links
 
 

2001 films
2001 animated films
2000s American animated films
American anthology films
American folklore films and television series
Disney direct-to-video animated films
Films based on mythology
American children's animated films
Johnny Appleseed